Achères-Ville is a French railway station in Achères commune, in Yvelines département, Île-de-France region.

Location 
The station is at kilometric point 23.594 of Achères-Pontoise railway. Its altitude is 30 m (98 ft).

History 
The station was put in operation in May 1976 to bring rail transport closer to the town. Until then Achères was only served by Achères–Grand-Cormier station, on Paris–Le Havre railway, located 2 km (1.24 mi) from the city center. This situation was due to the destruction of Village d'Achères station (on Achères–Pontoise railway), which was closer, but destroyed by bombings during the night from 7–8 June 1944, and never set in service again.

The station 
The additional word Ville prevents confusion with Achères–Grand-Cormier station.

The station has two lateral platforms, A and B, whose length is 220 meters.

Service

Train service 
Achères-Ville station is served by:
 One train every 10 minutes during workweek days, 1 train every 20 minutes on Saturdays and Sundays, 1 train every 30 minutes in the evenings on RER line A, toward Cergy-le-Haut or Paris and eastern suburbs
 One train every 10 minutes during peak hours on Transilien line L, toward Cergy-le-Haut or Paris Saint Lazare

Connections 
The station is served by Transdev (Conflans department) lines 5, A1 and A2. At night it is served by Noctilien bus line N152.

Notes and references

External links
 

Réseau Express Régional stations
Railway stations in Yvelines
Railway stations in France opened in 1976